Cœur Défense is an office skyscraper in La Défense, the high-rise business district west of Paris, France. With 350,000 m (3.77 million sq. ft), it is the building with the most floor space in Europe along with the Palace of Parliament in Bucharest.

Coeur Défense was built in 2001, replacing the former Esso Tower, the first building of the old generation to be destroyed in La Défense. Cœur Défense is a large complex made of two main bodies connected to one another by a smaller body and seating on a wide basis made of several smaller bodies. The edges of all bodies are rounded. The cladding is white, with large windows. An electronic system monitors white blinds which can be drawn or opened all together at the same time.

Both of them are relatively thin as their width is only , and they are out of line with each other, so that sunlight can reach all parts of the building.

Lehman Brothers' €2.1bn top-of-the-market purchase of Coeur Défense, was expected to become Europe's largest distressed property sale. Due to falling property values, and the bankruptcy of Lehman Brothers, the transaction was under stress. The borrower who owns the building, Heart of La Défense, had placed itself under sauvegarde .

See also 
 Skyscraper
 La Défense
 List of tallest structures in Paris
 World's largest buildings

External links 
 Official website
 Cœur Défense (Emporis)

References

Coeur Defense
Coeur Defense
Buildings and structures completed in 2001
21st-century architecture in France